HD 95370 is a single star in the southern constellation of Vela. With an apparent visual magnitude of 4.37, it can be viewed with the naked eye. It is moving closer to the Earth with a heliocentric radial velocity of −3.5 km/s.

According to Houk (1978), this is an A-type main-sequence star with a stellar classification of A3 V. However, Levato (1972) listed a class of A3 IV, which may suggest it is instead a more evolved subgiant star. It is 548 million years years old with a high projected rotational velocity of 115 km/s, giving it an oblate shape with an equatorial bulge that is 5% larger than the polar radius. HD 95370 has double the mass of the Sun and 2.6 times the Sun's radius. It is radiating 55 times the Sun's luminosity from its photosphere at an effective temperature of 8,696 K.

References

A-type main-sequence stars
Vela (constellation)
Velorum, i
Durchmusterung objects
095370
4293
053773